Medallion or Medallions may refer to:

 Medal (shortening of "medallion"), a carved or engraved circular piece of metal issued as a souvenir, award, work of art or fashion accessory
 Medallion (architecture), a large round or oval ornament on a building or monument

Entertainment
 "Medallion" (The Secret Circle), episode of the series The Secret Circle
 Medallion (film), the original title of the 2012 film Stolen
 Medallions (book), a short story collection by Zofia Nałkowska
 The Medallion, a 2003 action film
 Medallion Records (1919–1921), a record label

Transportation
 Medallion Air, a Romanian charter airline
 Eagle Medallion, an automobile built by Renault for AMC and later Chrysler, 1987–1989
 "Medallion taxi", a type of taxi that uses the below taxi medallion permit
 Taxi medallion, a permit granted by government in some cities, such as New York, to operate a vehicle for hire

Other uses
 Medallion silvertip nudibranch, a species of sea slug
 Medallion Fund, a hedge fund managed by Renaissance Technologies
 Medallion signature guarantee, a special signature guarantee for the transfer of securities in the United States
 Medallion Shield, a rugby union competition for schools in Ulster
 POM-3 "Medallion", a Russian anti-personnel mine
 The Medallions, a singing group